Pseudovolucella is a genus of hoverflies, from the family Syrphidae, in the order Diptera. They are bee mimics found mostly in the mountains of south east Asia.

Species
P. apiformis (De Meijere), 1919
P. apimima Hull, 1941
P. decipiens (Hervé-Bazin), 1914
P. fasciata Curran, 1931
P. himalayensis (Brunetti), 1907
P. hingstoni Coe, 1964
P. malayana (Curran), 1928
P. mimica Shiraki, 1930
P. ochracea Hull, 1944
P. sinepollex Reemer & Hippa, 2008

References

Diptera of Asia
Hoverfly genera
Eristalinae